Saint-Trivier-de-Courtes is a commune in the Ain department in eastern France.

Politics and administration

List of mayors

Population

See also
Communes of the Ain department

References

Communes of Ain
Ain communes articles needing translation from French Wikipedia
Bresse